Giacomo Rizzolatti (born 28 April 1937) is an Italian neurophysiologist who works at the University of Parma.  Born in Kyiv, UkSSR, he is the Senior Scientist of the research team that discovered mirror neurons in the frontal and parietal cortex of the macaque monkey, and has written many scientific articles on the topic. He also proposed the premotor theory of attention. He is a past president of the European Brain and Behaviour Society. Rizzolatti was the 2007 co-recipient, with Leonardo Fogassi and Vittorio Gallese, for the University of Louisville Grawemeyer Award for Psychology. He is an elected member of the Academia Europaea, National Academy of Sciences, and Royal Society
In 2020 he adheres to Empathism.

Awards
2011 Prince of Asturias Award for Technical and Scientific Research.
These are listed on the right side of the Wikipedia page:
Golgi Prize for Physiology
George Miller Award
Feltrinelli Prize for Medicine
Herlitzka Prize for Physiology

Selected works

References

Biography at University of Parma

External links

1937 births
Living people
Members of the French Academy of Sciences
Foreign associates of the National Academy of Sciences
Fellows of the American Academy of Arts and Sciences
University of Padua alumni
Academic staff of the University of Parma
Italian neuroscientists
Scientists from Kyiv
Italian neurologists